Alaska, the fourth album by the Silver Seas, was released in the summer of 2013. Frontman Daniel Tashian described it as the band's "country" record, explaining in a press release that they "tried to play well, crisply, economically, like country musicians. There is plenty of [producer Joe Pisapia's] steel guitar. The songs are about distance. Distance between places, weather, people, ideas. It's about somewhere you would never stumble on; you have to deliberately go to Alaska. I've never been there, I don't know if I will ever go, but I have a beautiful idea of what it's like." He added, "They say it takes an outsider to describe a place accurately; Joe's from New Jersey and I was born in Connecticut. Sometimes I see my friends go from relationship to relationship, looking for this place they see in their minds, but reality always falls short somehow ... Sometimes it's best to leave certain things to the imagination."

Track listing
All songs written by Daniel Tashian, except where noted.
 "Alaska" – 3:05
 "I'm the One" – 3:34
 "Lights Out" – 4:21
 "As the Crow Flies" – 4:11
 "Roxy" (Tashian, Josh Rouse) – 4:17
 "Sea of Regret" – 4:03
 "A Night on the Town" – 3:30
 "Karaoke Star" (Tashian, Angelo Petraglia) – 3:09
 "Wolfie" – 3:27
 "Wild Honey" – 3:50

Personnel
 David Gehrke: drums, percussion
 Jason Lehning: piano, Wurlitzer, organ, vibraphone, iPhone
 Joe Pisapia: bass, electric guitar, acoustic guitar, pedal steel guitar, banjo, keyboards, vocals
 Daniel Tashian: lead vocals, acoustic guitar, baritone guitar, mandolin, piano, Prophet '08 synthesizer, vibraphone, iPad, Logic Pro strings
 Jonathan Trebing: electric guitar on "I'm the One," "Roxy," and "A Night on the Town"

Production notes
Engineered by Greg Goodman and Joe Pisapia, mixed by Pisapia, and mastered by Jim DeMain at Yes Master Studios. Artwork and design by Sam Smith.

References

2013 albums
The Silver Seas albums